Świdwie  is a lake in north-western Poland, and is the site of a nature reserve and a Ramsar site (one of 13 such sites in Poland).

The lake is situated in West Pomeranian Voivodeship (in Police County) at the edge of the Wkrzańska Forest. It lies on the Gunica River.

It is also  a Natura 2000 EU Special Protection Area.

See also

Special Protection Areas in Poland

References

Lakes of West Pomeranian Voivodeship
Parks in West Pomeranian Voivodeship
Police County
Natura 2000 in Poland
Ramsar sites in Poland
Lakes of Poland